KVVV may refer to:

KVVV-LD A low-power television station serving Houston, formerly a translator for what is now KUBE-TV (in which its call sign came from)
KVVV-FM a radio station now KFGY
KVVV-TV A former independent television station serving Galveston, Texas
KVVV the ICAO airport code for Ortonville Municipal Airport